Reginald R. Robinson (born October 19, 1972) is an American jazz and ragtime pianist. In 2004, he received a MacArthur Genius Grant.

Biography
Robinson was raised in Chicago. A self-taught musician, Robinson's love for ragtime began in the 7th grade His mother purchased a piano and he spent the next three years submerged in the self study of music. In 1988 Robinson took lessons with Theodore Bargman at the American Conservatory of Music in downtown Chicago. He also studied sight-reading and began to compose music in various styles including ragtime piano.

In 1992 he was introduced to pianist Jon Weber; who helped him make a professional demo of his compositions and arranged for his first public performance at The Green Mill. In 2004 Robinson won the John D. and Catherine T. MacArthur Foundation "genius award". In December 1993, Robinson was a guest on "Piano Jazz" with Marian McPartland.

Discography 
 Man Out of Time (self-released, 2007)
 Reflections (self-released, 2010)
 Euphonic Sounds (Delmark, 1998)
 Sounds in Silhouette (Delmark, 1994)
 The Strongman (Delmark, 1993)

References

External links
WMFT Radio: "Reginald R. Robinson, piano [Encore Broadcast] July 3, 2020"
"River Raisin Ragtime Review: Music of Reginald R. Robinson, Live in Concert" Scott Yanow. The Syncopated Times. December 1, 2017
"Reginald Robinson celebrates a landmark recording" Chicago Tribune. Howard Reich. December 13, 2017
MacArthur Foundation. "Reginald R. Robinson News"

1972 births
African-American jazz musicians
African-American jazz pianists
Living people
MacArthur Fellows
Musicians from Chicago
Ragtime composers
Place of birth missing (living people)
Jazz musicians from Illinois
American male pianists
American male jazz musicians
21st-century African-American people
20th-century African-American people